Benjamin Merkle may refer to:

 Benjamin L. Merkle (born 1971), New Testament scholar
 Benjamin R. Merkle, president of New Saint Andrews College